Richard Edward Frank (January 4, 1953 – August 27, 1995) was an American actor. He was perhaps best known as Father Vogler in the 1984 movie Amadeus. Frank had numerous guest appearances in television shows, with a regular role in the sitcom Anything but Love.

Biography
Born in Boston, Frank was a graduate of Juilliard's acting school. In addition, Frank appeared in numerous theater productions, including Hang on to Me at the Guthrie Theater, directed by Peter Sellers, as well as many productions in Los Angeles, mostly at the Taper. He created the Struggling Actor's Coloring Book and dozens of paintings, which are now in private collections. He was noted by colleagues for his intelligence and endless wit.

Frank played infamous lawyer and informal powerbroker Roy Cohn in the first performance of Tony Kushner's play Angels in America. Cohn also died from AIDS-related complications.

By 1993, Frank had already gone public with his affliction with AIDS. In the wake of his public disclosure, Frank was asked to guest-star in the fourth season Life Goes On episode "Bedfellows". Frank played Chester, the hospital roommate of Jesse McKenna (Chad Lowe), while both were admitted for illnesses related to their AIDS statuses. Chester has a more advanced stage of AIDS, and is not expected to live much longer; Jesse has to convince Chester at one point not to take his life by jumping off the hospital roof. Chester does lose his battle with AIDS before the episode's end, but not before passing on wisdom to Jesse for his own dealings with his illness.

Following his landmark appearance on Life Goes On, Frank's health began a gradual decline, but throughout 1994, he kept up his steady guest turns on series ranging from The Larry Sanders Show to Matlock. By the beginning of 1995, in order to preserve his frail health, Frank made the decision to become a television director. That year, an episode of Mad About You he directed was slated to be the first of many such jobs for the actor, but ultimately it became his final work in show business.

Death
On August 27, 1995, Frank died in Los Angeles of complications from AIDS.

Filmography

External links

1953 births
1995 deaths
AIDS-related deaths in California
20th-century American male actors
Male actors from Boston
Juilliard School alumni
American male film actors
American male television actors
American male stage actors
American television directors
20th-century American singers